Notobubastes is a genus of beetles in the family Buprestidae, containing the following species:

 Notobubastes aurosulcata Carter, 1924
 Notobubastes costata Carter, 1924
 Notobubastes occidentalis Carter, 1924
 Notobubastes orientalis Carter, 1924

References

Buprestidae genera